Rainey Old Boys Rugby Football Club is situated in the market town of Magherafelt, County Londonderry, Northern Ireland playing in Division 2A of the All-Ireland League.

At present, they field 4 senior teams and 3 youth teams (the Rhinos) under-18s, under-16s and under-14s as well as a girls under-14s side.

History

Magherafelt R.F.C. was founded in 1928. Some success was gained up until the Second World War. A few games were played during the war years and from 1947, the club became known as Rainey Old Boys R.F.C., in recognition of its connection with the local Rainey Endowed School. After initial success, a barren period followed and it was not until the mid-1960s that the club began to go places.

In 1983 they won the Towns Cup for the first time. On that team were twelve times capped Harry Steele and brother-in-law, Alan McLean, an Ulster regular who toured Australia with Ireland in 1979.

The President from 1984–1990 was Dr. A.A. McConnell, who was a member of Ireland's Grand Slam side in 1948.

Rainey proved to be a good cup side but were relegated to Section 2 in 1986. They won Section 2 the following year but slipped back down again in 1994 despite reaching the Towns Cup final for the sixth time in twenty years. With former Ulster lock Charlie Simpson as player/coach, they won the Towns Cup in 2001 and were promoted as champions the following season.
 
Former Ballymena RFC No. 8, John Andrews, took over as player/coach when Charlie moved on to Dungannon RFC, and led the side to the Qualifying League 1 title in 2005. In the play-offs they beat Monivea 21-8 at home before losing 14-13 at Naas and 18-17 at Nenagh Ormond.

Having added some strength in depth to the squad, they started last season by beating Ballymena 2XV in the Past Players’ Cup Final. After twelve straight wins in the league, they came unstuck at Armagh on New Year's Eve but regrouped to beat second placed Limavady 53-3 and retain the title. In the inaugural All-Ireland Junior Cup the luck of the draw helped them to beat Cork side Kanturk 47-9 and south Dublin outfit, Seapoint 31-12 at home. A big crowd travelled south to see them beat Youghal 27-5 at Lansdowne Road in the final. Then on successive Saturdays, they beat Westport 36-0 away, Youghal 34-0 and Monkstown 32-16 at home to win the round robin play-offs and clinch their place in the All-Ireland League.

At the end of the 2006/07 season John Andrews left to join Dungannon RFC as their new head coach. In his 5 years at the club he guided them to 2 Ulster Qualifying titles, the Past Players' Cup, the All-Ireland Junior Cup, runners-up in the Towns Cup and qualification into the All-Ireland League.

The 2006–07 season featured Rainey's first appearance in the AIB League. Rainey finished in a mid-table seventh place in Division Three. In addition Rainey finished in sixth place in their first year in the Ulster Senior League. On 17 July 2007 it was announced that Willie Anderson had been appointed as club coach. Willie Anderson left at the end of 2007–08 season and Rainey appointed Rhys Botha from Ballymena as coach for the 2008–10 seasons.

Chris Campbell and Richard Boyd took over the coaching reigns of the club until 2013 after the 1st XV gained promotion into 2A after an undefeated season in 2B winning 14 matches and drawing 1. This was a highly successful season for the club who also contested their first ever Senior Cup final in Ravenhill in December 2012 where they were beaten by a strong Ballymena side.

Richard Boyd remained as head coach assisted by John Andrews until 2015. 

Since 2015 John Andrews has been Head Coach assisted by Damien Campbell and Terry McMaster. Following relegation due to a re-jigging of the leagues in 2016, Rainey were promoted to 2B once again in 2017 by beating Tullamore in the playoff final. There was heartbreak the following year when a last minute Navan try prevented them from gaining promotion to 2A in 2018. This heartbreak was soon forgotten about the following season when promotion to Division 2A was obtained once again through the playoffs by beating Greystones away in the semifinal and the illustrious Blackrock College RFC in the final the following week.

History was created in December 2019 when Rainey won the Ulster Senior League for the first time in their history.

A young player (Phelim Trainor) who has had his fair share of misfortunes in recent months succumbed to the pressures of the "rugby lifestyle". (Saturday 14 November 2015) Inspiring weeks of training set up the young sportsman with the chance to play for the illustrious 2nd XV vs Armagh only to be dealt a bad hand the morning of the match and was asked not to play in favour of a superior player. When this news broke it was widely rumoured his decline to the 3rd XV and then 4th XV has yet again broken the young man's spirit.

Many men would have given up following this serious of misfortunate events, however, Phelim Trainor is not just your ordinary man. On the 5th of March 2022, Phelim laced his boots up once again for the Rainey Old Boys 4th XV following a liquid breakfast in a local establishment and a packet of bacon fries for some sustinence. What transpired over the next 80 minutes was a performance to rival that of Dan Carters in the second test versus the Lions in 2005. In 10 pin bowling, scoring 300 points is known as the “perfect game”, at Limavady on the 5th March 2022, Phelim had “the perfect game”, his 2015 misfortunes were now behind him and young Trainor was carried shoulder high off the pitch by his team mates in recognition of the masterclass he had just given on the swampy marshlands of the River Roe. In years to come, people will ask, “Where were you when JFK was shot?”, “Where were you when the man slipped on the ice on the RTE News?” and now when asked “Where were you when Phelim had the perfect game?”, I will be able to say, “I was there”.

Current status 

Rainey Old Boys finished 10th in AIB Division Three in the 2008–09 season.

Rainey Old Boys finished 10th again in AIB Division Three in the 2009–10 season and 6th in AIB Division Three in the 2010–11 season.

The following season they narrowly missed out on promotion to AIB Division 2A, coming 5th in the 2011–12 season. Finishing 4 points behind second place and promotion.

In the 2012–13 they won AIB Division 2B, going undefeated in the league the whole season, winning 14 and drawing 1. Having scored more points, as well as conceding less, than any other team in the whole All-Ireland League, they gained promotion in some style. In what was to be the most successful season in the club's history, they also reached the final of the Ulster Senior Cup against all the odds, knocking out giants of ulster rugby Dungannon R.F.C. and Malone R.F.C., both away from home, en route to Ravenhill.

After a period of life in Division 2C, Rainey gained promotion to Division 2B in 2016/17 beating Sligo away in the playoff semi final before beating Tullamore at home the following week to ensure promotion to Division 2B.

After a loss in the playoff final against Navan at home in the 2017/18 season, the 1st XV regrouped for the 2018/19 season and performed consistently all season to secure a place in the playoffs for the 3rd season in a row. After beating Greystones away in a tight game in the semifinal, they travelled to Stradbrook to take on Irish Rugby Kingpins, Blackrock College RFC in the final. Rainey achieved promotion to Division 2A of the Energia AIL with a 35-21 victory on a sunny day in Stradbook in one of the most famous days in the club's history.

Rainey won the Ulster Senior League for the first time in their history in December 2019.

Rainey competed in Division 2A of the Energia AIL in 2021/22 season and were unfortunately relegated to 2B following a play off loss to Nenagh Ormond.

Hooker Brad Roberts was called into the Ulster Rugby squad in November 2020 and made his debut away to Edinburgh on 30th November 2020. He follows in the footsteps of fellow Rainey man Tommy O'Hagan who played for Ulster in the 2018/19 season.

Bradley Roberts made his Welsh debut against South Africa in November 2021.

Local musician and former 1st XV Waterboy and Ballboy, J.C Stewart filmed part of a music video for MTV at the club in November 2019.

Honours
Ulster Senior League: 1
 2019-20
Ulster Towns Cup: 2
 1982–83, 2000–01
Ulster Junior Cup: 2
 1975–76, 1978-79

Management 22/23

Chairman : Stevie Rutledge (Ireland)

1st XV Team Manager / Director of Rugby : Brian Smyth (Ireland)

1st XV Head Coach : Ian McKinley (Italian Rugby Union)

1st XV Assistant Coaches : James Doherty (Ireland)

Club Captain : Tommy O'Hagan (Ireland)

2nd XV Coach : Nicky Stirling (Ireland)

2nd XV Captain : Aaron Doherty (Ireland)

3rd XV Captain : Hugh Mulholland (Ireland)

4th XV Captain : Rickie Tuff (Ireland)

Internationals

Dr A.A McConnell - Ireland

Nathan Amos -  Israel

Bradley Roberts - Wales

Harry Steele - Ireland

Paul Pritchard - Germany

Conor Brockschmidt - Germany

Mark Harbison - British Virgin Islands

Paul Kelly - Bermuda

Stephen McKinstry - (Ireland Under 19s)

Stephen Beattie -  United States Under 19s

Michael Glancy - (Ireland Under 21s) and Hong Kong National Team

Connor Lavery - (Ireland Under 19s)

John McCusker - Ireland U18s

Jack McIntosh - Ireland U18s

Mark Lee - Ireland U18s

Sources

External links 
 Rainey Old Boys RFC Website

Rugby union clubs in Northern Ireland
Irish rugby union teams
Rugby union clubs in County Londonderry
Senior Irish rugby clubs (Ulster)
Rugby clubs established in 1928
1928 establishments in Northern Ireland
Magherafelt